Jasmine Social Investments is a New Zealand-based private foundation started by the entrepreneur Sam Morgan in 2006 following the sale of his company Trade Me to Fairfax Media.

Similar resources

 Acumen Fund
 Bill and Melinda Gates Foundation
 Good Ventures
 Mulago Foundation
 Omidyar Network
 Peery Foundation
 Skoll Foundation
 Draper Richards Kaplan Foundation

References

External links
 

Foundations based in New Zealand
2006 establishments in New Zealand